Hudson Independent School District is a public school district based in Hudson, Texas (USA).

In 2009, the school district was rated "recognized" by the Texas Education Agency.

History
The current Hudson school began as the traditional "one-room schoolhouse" in 1880. After several moves, it relocated to its current location in 1928.

That same year, the Hudson, Narroway, and Bethlehem districts voted to consolidate into the Hudson Consolidated Common School District, and the Chancy Switch district was later annexed into the district that same year.

In 1930 the Providence, Peavy Switch, and Happy Hour districts voted to consolidate into the Hudson district.

In 1940, Hudson became an independent school district, adopting its present name.

The school has a unique relationship with the nearby Apple Springs Independent School District. Apple Springs participates in six-man football but does not offer a band program, while Hudson has a band but does not participate in football. Therefore, the Hudson band participates at Apple Springs games. The unusual relationship was filmed by the crew of the popular Texas Country Reporter. The television show aired on November 16, 2008. Additional sports offered include soccer, cross country, basketball, track, golf, softball, baseball, and volleyball.

Schools
In the 2021-2022 school year, the district had students in five schools. 
High schools
Hudson High School (Grades 9-12)
Middle schools
Hudson Middle School (Grades 6-8)
Elementary schools
W.H. Bonner Elementary School (Grades 3-5)
W.F. Peavy Primary School (Grades EE-2)
Alternative schools
Stubblefield Learning Center (Grades 9-12)

References

External links

School districts in Angelina County, Texas
School districts established in 1940
1940 establishments in Texas